Lego BrickHeadz is a Lego theme that recreates iconic characters from themes like DC Comics, Marvel Comics, Star Wars and Disney as buildable characters. The theme was first introduced in 2016.

Overview
The product line focuses on the buildable characters. Each set measures over 2” (7 cm) tall and contains at least 143 pieces. The legs are 4 plates high and are usually constructed from four 1x2 plates. The torso is usually constructed on a 4x4 plate, and is two bricks and one plate high. The arms are usually formed around a 2x2 plate and a 11476 Plate 1x2 W. 1 Horizontal Snap for the hand. The head is the most distinctive part but the core of it is the simplest and common to all models. Twelve 22885 Brick 1x2x1 2/3 W/4 Knobs are mounted on a 4x4 plate or equivalent. Also included Baseplate measures over 1” (4 cm) square and under 1” (1 cm) high for the buildable character to stand. The sets were designed primarily for children with an age rating of 10+ or above.

In 2020, Lego Masters USA judge and Lego Design Lead Amy Corbett had recreated her latest outfits from the show as Lego BrickHeadz models.

Development
Lego BrickHeadz is a new line of collectible figures. BrickHeadz is designed for kids who love the Lego brand but don't have time to spend two hours on a build. Each collectible figure takes approximately 10 to 15 minutes to create. Michael McNally, senior director of brand relations for Lego explained, "This sort of one-size-fits-all approach is not as appealing as it used to be,” and continued, "The onus then is really on brands to diversify their offerings so that there is something for everyone. We’ll always have free-form, open-ended building opportunities, but we’re always looking for surgical ways we can manipulate the Lego system in a way that might grab the attention of a completely different kid who needs a different solution.”

BrickHeadz Designer Austin Carlson discussed about designing a BrickHeadz model and explained, "The start is a lot like a Lego Minifigure where I note the most important icons of the character and start from there. So for example, the startup for the Comic Con Joker BrickHead was intended to be more “classic” Joker so we wanted a tuxedo suit feel and a more slick back pointy hair for him. And the Joker is always known for his smile so we knew we needed that and Nic Groves added his big flower to him to capture his tricky clown nature. The same could be said with Superman's traditional curly-Q hair and how we captured that through a Unikitty tail!"

During the Lego Fan Media Days, BrickHeadz Designers Austin Carlson and Marcos Bessa discussed how they came about and what the future holds for the series. Austin Carlson explained, "In the earliest stages things did change around. If you look at the original elephant, you can see there is a lack of real hands, and the base was slightly different. Then we needed them to be able to hold accessories; we needed printed eyes, decoration, things like that. So there was an evolution of the design, and as it became more defined we developed a set style guide." and continued, "Specifically, it defined the height of the body, the legs, the arms. Where we start to play around a little bit is usually with accessories and the hair, what’s iconic to the character. The one that I keep referencing is Black Widow, because of the amount of detail in the hair. But it makes a silhouette of the character that’s easily recognisable; it’s the same thing with Batman and the pointy ears. So when it comes to head accessories and items, stuff like that, we need to make sure it’s included, but at the same time we still have to meet our own style guide, much like how every minifigure is designed." Marcos Bessa explained, "The more characters we create and bring to the family, the more questions it raises [about the core design]. There are characters that make an exception to what we created as a core, and then we have to figure out how we represent this thing, this detail. So it’s always interesting to have these challenges!"

Austin Carlson discussed his role as graphic designer and his input to the collectable minifigure series. Austin Carlson explained, "My involvement on Brickheadz has been completely handed over to Marcos now. I was originally hired as a graphic designer, that’s my job title, so for the first series of Brickheadz I was juggling building and doing graphic design at the same time. It was a difficult task because I had to balance them, but now all the responsibility for Brickheadz has been handed over, I can go back to focusing completely on the collectable minifigure series, and other graphic design related work."

Marcos Bessa discussed the idea for a character that end up deciding just does not fit the BrickHeadz style and explained, "We’ve had a couple that turned out to be a bit more challenging in execution, that we have paused and might then revisit to see if we find new solutions. Maybe in the future a new part gets developed that suddenly triggers that solution that we haven't come up with. But there are also certain characters that just completely challenge the form, because BrickHeadz is primarily a small little square body with a huge head, and if you look at something like Blue, the raptor from Jurassic World, it challenges the whole form. That was a particularly hard one to execute. But we feel that we still managed to get a pretty recognisable and cool model that stays true to what the reference is, but also stays true to what BrickHeadz are.

Marcos Bessa discussed about the two new types of glasses from the Go Brick Me (set number: 41957) and explained, "The brief for the BrickHeadz line actually came with a request to do something like this. The idea for the Go Brick Me set came very early, in early 2017, so the brand was just about to come out officially on the market. We were already planning what to do for 2018 and so the importance of customisation, allowing people to represent their features was of key importance for this. So we immediately started looking into what that would mean in terms of new elements –  how to make glasses, do we need something new? I started exploring and came up with a whole lot of variations of new elements that we could make, trying to come up with something that would work and fulfil the brief for this purpose, but become a versatile enough element that it could become interesting for other uses. And I think we ended up finding something that is pretty cool for what we do in the set, but also offers a lot of other opportunities, and I'm really looking forward to seeing what comes out of it.

Launch
The Lego BrickHeadz theme was launched at the San Diego Comic-Con in 2017. The convention-exclusive two-packs only available at the Lego booth, with characters included Captain America, Wonder Woman and The Joker based on the DC Comics and Marvel Comics. 

In 2019, Lego Design Manager Marcos Bessa announced the Lego BrickHeadz theme will continue into 2020 and presumably expand again as licensed characters return to the line-up.

Sub-themes 
According to Bricklink, The Lego Group released 135 playsets as part of the Lego BrickHeadz theme.

Avatar 
In 2022, The Lego Group revealed at the San Diego Comic-Con in 2022 a brand new set named Jake Sully & his Avatar (set number: 40554) will be released on 1 October 2022 and based on James Cameron's Avatar film series. The set consists of 246 pieces and 1 baseplate. The set included 2 versions of Jake Sully in his human form with wheelchair and his Avatar form with spear.

Back to the Future 
Marty McFly & Doc Brown (set number: 41611) was released on 18 April 2018 and based on the Back to the Future film. The set consists of 240 pieces and 2 baseplates. The set included Doc Brown's a detachable DeLorean time machine controller and Marty's a detachable camcorder.

DC Comics Super Heroes 
In 2016, Superman & Wonder Woman (set number: 41490), Batman & The Joker (set number: 41491), Supergirl & Martian Manhunter (set number: 41496) was an exclusive sets are only available at San Diego Comic-Con.

Several Lego DC Comics Super Heroes characters based on Justice League film have been released as part of the Lego BrickHeadz theme. A range of DC Comics Super Heroes BrickHeadz was announced in January 2018, which included The Flash (set number: 41598), Wonder Woman (set number: 41599), Aquaman (set number: 41600), Cyborg (set number: 41601) and Tactical Batman & Superman (set number: 41610) as buildable characters.

Disney 
In 2017, Belle (set number: 41595) and Beast (set number: 41596) were released on 1 March 2017 and based on the Beauty and the Beast film. Later, Captain Jack Sparrow (set number: 41593) and Captain Armando Salazar (set number: 41594) were released on 2 April 2017 and based on the Pirates of the Caribbean: Dead Men Tell No Tales film.

In 2018, Mr. Incredible & Frozone (set number: 41613) was released in April 2018 and based on Incredibles 2 film. The set consists of 160 pieces and 2 baseplates. Elsa (set number: 41617) and Anna & Olaf (set number: 41618) were released in July 2018 and based on the Frozen film. Ariel & Ursula (set number: 41623) was released in July 2018 and based on The Little Mermaid film. The set consists of 361 pieces and 2 baseplates. Jack Skellington & Sally (set number: 41630) was released in October 2018 and based on The Nightmare Before Christmas film. The set consists of 193 pieces and 2 baseplates.

In 2020, Donald Duck (set number: 40377) and Goofy & Pluto (set number: 40378) were released in February 2020 and based on the Disney cartoon characters. Later, Mickey Mouse (set number: 41624) and Minnie Mouse (set number: 41625) were released in August 2020 and based on the Disney cartoon characters. 

In 2021, Daisy Duck (set number: 40476) and Scrooge McDuck, Huey, Dewey & Louie (set number: 40477) were released in June 2021 and based on the Disney cartoon characters. In December 2021, The Lego Group had revealed the two new sets are Buzz Lightyear (set number: 40552) and Woody & Bo Peep (set number: 40553) were released in February 2022 and based on the Toy Story film. Buzz Lightyear (set number: 40552) consists of 114 pieces with a baseplate and Woody & Bo Peep (set number: 40553) consists of 296 pieces with 2 baseplates.

In January 2022, Chip & Dale (set number: 40550) was released on 1 March 2022 and based on Chip 'n Dale: Rescue Rangers TV series. The set consists of 226 pieces with 2 baseplates.

In January 2023, Disney 100th Celebration (set number: 40622) will be on 1 February 2023 and based on Oswald the Lucky Rabbit, Mickey Mouse (as seen in Steamboat Willie), Snow White and Tinker Bell Disney cartoon characters. The set consists of 501 pieces with 4 baseplates. In addition, EVE & WALL•E (set number: 40619), Cruella & Maleficent (set number: 40620) and Moana & Merida (set number: 40621) were be released on 1 March 2023.

Ghostbusters 
Peter Venkman & Slimer (set number: 41622) was released on 1 July 2018 and based on the original 1984 Ghostbusters film. The set consists of 228 pieces and 2 baseplates. The set included Peter Venkman's Proton pack and Slimer's hot dogs.

Go Brick Me 
In 2018, Go Brick Me (set number: 41597) was released on 2 April 2018. The set consists of 708 pieces and 2 baceplates.

In 2022, The Lego Group revealed at the LEGO CON 2022 a brand new set named FC Barcelona Go Brick Me (set number: 40542) will be released on 1 August 2022. The set consists of 530 pieces and 1 baseplate. Also included 3 different skin tones, 4 different hair colors and variety of hair styles.

In July 2022, Manchester United Go Brick Me (set number: 40541) will be released on 1 August 2022. The set consists of 530 pieces and 1 baceplate. Also included 3 different skin tones, 4 different hair colors and variety of hair styles.

Jurassic World 
Owen & Blue (set number: 41614) was released on 17 April 2018 and based on the Jurassic World: Fallen Kingdom film. The set consists of 234 pieces and 2 baseplates. The set included Owen's tranquilizer gun and Blue's ferocious white teeth.

Looney Tunes 
Road Runner and Wile E. Coyote (set number: 40559) was released on 1 February 2022 and based on the Looney Tunes characters. The set consists of 205 pieces and 2 baseplates.

Marvel Comics 
In 2016, Iron Man & Captain America (set number: 41492), Black Panther & Doctor Strange (set number: 41493), Spider-Man & Venom (set number: 41497) was an exclusive sets only available at San Diego Comic-Con.

In 2017, Captain America (set number: 41589), Iron Man (set number: 41590), Black Widow (set number: 41591) and The Hulk (set number: 41592) were released in March 2017.

In 2018, Iron Man MK50 (set number: 41604), Thanos (set number: 41605), Star-Lord (set number: 41606) and Gamora (set number: 41607) were released on 2 April 2018 and based on the Avengers: Endgame film. Later, Groot & Rocket (set number: 41626) was released on 2 October 2018.

Minecraft 
Steve & Creeper (set number: 41612) was released in August 2018 and based on the Minecraft video game. The set consists of 160 pieces and 2 baseplates.

In March 2023, Alex (set number: 40624), Llama (set number: 40625) and Zombie (set number: 40626) were be released on 1 April 2023.

Minions: The Rise of Gru 
Gru, Stuart and Otto (set number: 40420) and Belle Bottom, Kevin and Bob (set number: 40421) were released in April 2021 and based on the Minions: The Rise of Gru film.

Miscellaneous 
Geoffrey (set number: 40316) was an exclusive set only available at Toys "R" Us.

Lady Liberty (set number: 40367) was released on 4 July 2019. The set consists of 153 pieces and baseplate.

Spice Girls Tribute (set number: 40548) was released on 1 March 2018 and based on Spice Girls are a British girl group from England. The set consists of 578 pieces and 5 baceplates. Lego Designer Daniel Squirrell discussed the process behind Spice Girls Tribute (set number: 40548) and how important it was to get the fine details just right to pay homage to the band. Lego Designer Daniel Squirrell explained, “The band members have famous outfits and iconic looks, like Geri’s Union Jack dress, Mel B’s trademark leopard print, Emma’s baby-pink dresses and pigtails, Melanie C’s tracksuits and of course Victoria’s little black dress,” and continued, “They have a meaningful history in British music and the youth of many of my peers, so it was important to reference these moments for the fans.”

Monkie Kid 
Monkey King (set number: 40381) was released on 1 August 2020 and based on the Lego Monkie Kid theme. The set consists of 175 pieces and a baseplate. The set included a Golden Staff.

Pets 
Several Lego Pets characters have also been released as part of the Lego BrickHeadz theme. A range of Lego Pets BrickHeadz was announced in 2021, which included German Shepherd (set number: 40440), Shorthair Cats (set number: 40441), Goldfish (set number: 40442), Budgie, Dalmatian (set number: 40479), Ginger Tabby (set number: 40480), Cockatiel (set number: 40481) and Hamster (set number: 40482).

St. Bernard (set number: 40543) and French Bulldog (set number: 40544) was released in January 2022.

Koi Fish (set number: 40545) and Poodles (set number: 40546) were be released in August 2022.

Promotional 
Nonnie - Inside Tour 2017 Edition, Amsterdam BrickHeadz, Beijing BrickHeadz, Cologne BrickHeadz and Hangzhou Brickheadz was released as promotion.

Seasonal 
Several Lego Seasonal characters have also been released as part of the Lego BrickHeadz theme. A range of Lego Seasonal BrickHeadz was announced in 2018, which included Valentine's Bee (set number: 40270), Easter Bunny (set number: 40271), Halloween Witch (set number: 40272), Thanksgiving Turkey (set number: 40273) and Mr. & Mrs. Claus (set number: 40274).

In 2019, Lego Seasonal BrickHeadz including Birthday Clown (set number: 40348), Valentine's Puppy (set number: 40349), Easter Chick (set number: 40350), Halloween Ghost (set number: 40351), Thanksgiving Scarecrow (set number: 40352), Reindeer, Elf & Elfie (set number: 40353) and Dragon Dance Guy (set number: 40354) were released as well.

In 2019, Lego Seasonal BrickHeadz including Valentine's Bear (set number: 40379), Easter Sheep (set number: 40380), Nutcracker (set number: 40425), and Lucky Cat (set number: 40436) were released as well.

In 2021, Chinese New Year Pandas (set number: 40466) was released in January 2021. The set consists of 249 pieces and 3 baseplates. The set included a lantern and a buildable mandarin orange tree. La Catrina (set number: 40492) was released in August 2021. The set consists of 141 pieces and a baseplate.

In 2022, Lion Dance Guy (set number: 40540) was released in January 2022. The set consists of 239 pieces and a baseplate.

Star Wars 
Several Lego Star Wars characters have also been released as part of the Lego BrickHeadz theme. A range of Lego Star Wars BrickHeadz was announced in 2017, which included Finn (set number: 41485), Captain Phasma (set number: 41486), Rey (set number: 41602), Kylo Ren (set number: 41603), Han Solo (set number: 41608), Chewbacca (set number: 41609), Darth Vader (set number: 41619),  Stormtrooper (set number: 41620), Luke Skywalker & Yoda (set number: 41627), Leia Organa (set number: 41628), Boba Fett (set number: 41629), Boba Fett and Han Solo in Carbonite (set number: 41498) and Kylo Ren & Sith Trooper (set number: 75232) as buildable characters.

The Mandalorian & The Child (set number: 75317) was released on 20 February 2020 and based on The Mandalorian TV series. The set consists of 295 pieces and 2 baseplates. The set included Mandalorian's a blaster rifle clipped on the back and a blaster pistol in hand and The Child's a hoverpram.

Ahsoka Tano (set number: 40539) was released in January 2022 and based on Star Wars: The Clone Wars TV series. The set consists of 164 pieces and a baseplate. The set included Ahsoka Tano's two lightsabers. Ahsoka Tano (set number: 40539) has come full circle as Lego Ideas hosts a model showcase to mark the revealed of the 150th BrickHeadz.

Obi-Wan Kenobi & Darth Vader (set number: 40547) was released in August 2022 and based on Obi-Wan Kenobi TV series. The set consists of 260 pieces and two baseplates. The set included Obi-Wan Kenobi's lightsaber and Darth Vader's lightsaber.

Tusken Raider (set number: 40615) will be released in January 2023 and based on Star Wars: Episode IV – A New Hope film. The set consists of 152 pieces and a baseplate.

Stranger Things 
Demogorgon & Eleven (set number: 40549) was released on 1 February 2022 and based on the Stranger Things Netflix sci-fi horror series. The set consists of 192 pieces and 2 baseplates.

The Lego Batman Movie 
Several The Lego Batman Movie characters have also been released as part of the Lego BrickHeadz theme. A range of The Lego Batman Movie BrickHeadz was announced on 1 March 2017, which included Batman (set number: 41585), Batgirl (set number: 41586), Robin (set number: 41587) and The Joker (set number: 41588) as buildable characters.

The Lego Movie 2: The Second Part 
Several The Lego Movie 2: The Second Part characters have also been released as part of the Lego BrickHeadz theme. A range of The Lego Movie 2: The Second Part BrickHeadz was announced in 2019, which included Emmet (set number: 41634), Wyldstyle (set number: 41635), Benny (set number: 41636) and Sweet Mayhem (set number: 41637) as buildable characters.

The Lego Ninjago Movie 
Several The Lego Ninjago Movie characters have also been released as part of the Lego BrickHeadz theme. A range of The Lego Ninjago Movie BrickHeadz was announced in September 2017, which included Lloyd (set number: 41487) and Master Wu (set number: 41488) as buildable characters.

Lego Ninjago 
Several Lego Ninjago characters have also been released as part of the Lego BrickHeadz theme. A range of 10th anniversary BrickHeadz was announced in May 2021, which included Golden Lloyd, Nya Samurai X, and Firstbourne Dragon as buildable characters.

The Lord of the Rings 
Frodo & Gollum (set number: 40630), Gandalf the Grey & Balrog (set number: 40631) and Aragorn & Arwen (set number: 40632) were be released on 1 January 2023 and based on The Lord of the Rings film trilogy.

The Simpsons 
Homer Simpson & Krusty the Clown (set number: 41632) was released on 2 October 2018 and based on The Simpsons television series. The set consists of 215 pieces and 2 baseplates.

Universal Monsters 
Frankenstein (set number: 40422) was released on 17 September 2020 and was based on the Universal Monsters character of Frankenstein's monster. The set consists of 108 pieces and baseplate.

Wedding 
Wedding Bride (set number: 40383) and Wedding Groom (set number: 40384) were released in January 2020. The Wedding Bride set consists of 306 pieces and Wedding Groom set consists of 255 pieces.

Wizarding World 
Several Lego Wizarding World based on Harry Potter series have been released as part of the Lego BrickHeadz theme. A range of Wizarding World BrickHeadz was announced in October 2018, which included Newt Scamander & Gellert Grindelwald (set number: 41631), Ron Weasley & Albus Dumbledore (set number: 41621), Hermione Granger (set number: 41616) and Harry Potter & Hedwig (set number: 41615).

In 2020, Hagrid & Buckbeak (set number: 40412) was a free gift with qualifying purchases in Lego store.

In 2021, Harry, Hermione, Ron & Hagrid (set number: 40495) and Voldemort, Nagini & Bellatrix (set number: 40496) was released in June 2021.

In 2022, Professors of Hogwarts (set number: 40560) was released in June 2022. The set consists of 601 pieces with 4 baseplates. The set included Professors Severus Snape, Minerva McGonagall, Alastor 'Mad-Eye' Moody and Sybill Trelawney.

App
An app titled Lego BrickHeadz Builder was developed by The Lego Group for Android and released on 12 July 2018.

Reception
In 2019, Harry Potter and Hedwig (set number: 41615) was listed as one of The Top Ten best-selling Harry Potter toys in the UK for the 12 months ending May 2019.

See also
 Lego Avatar
 Lego Super Heroes
 The Lego Movie (Lego theme)
 The Lego Ninjago Movie (Lego theme)
 Lego Ninjago
 Lego Harry Potter
 Lego Disney
 Lego Star Wars
 Lego Jurassic World (theme)
 Lego Stranger Things
 Lego Minions: The Rise of Gru
 Lego Minecraft
 Lego Monkie Kid
 Lego The Lord of the Rings

References

External links 
 Official website

Lego themes
Products introduced in 2016